Yana Kalinina (born 14 November 1994) is a Ukrainian footballer who plays as a forward playing in Ukrainian Women's League.

External links 
 
 Yana Kalinina

1994 births
Living people
People from Okhtyrka
Ukrainian women's footballers
Women's association football forwards
WFC Zhytlobud-2 Kharkiv players
Ukraine women's international footballers
Ukrainian expatriate women's footballers
Ukrainian expatriate sportspeople in Poland
Expatriate women's footballers in Poland
Sportspeople from Sumy Oblast